Sudirman was an Indonesian army general.

Sudirman may also refer to:
Sudirman (footballer, born 1969)
Sudirman (footballer, born 1983)
Sudirman (horse)
Sudirman Cup, a badminton championship
Sudirman railway station, a commuter rail station in Jakarta
Sudirman Range, a mountain range in Papua
Jalan Jenderal Sudirman, often shortened to Sudirman, a major north-south arterial road in Jakarta

People with the surname
Sudirman Arshad, Malaysian singer
Dick Sudirman (1922–1986), Indonesian badminton player
Sudirman Said (born 1963), 15th Minister of Energy and Mineral Resources of Indonesia